The 2022 Texas Longhorns baseball team represented the University of Texas at Austin during the 2022 NCAA Division I baseball season.
The Longhorns played their home games at UFCU Disch–Falk Field as a member of the Big 12 Conference.
They were led by head coach David Pierce, in his 6th season at Texas.

Previous season

Regular season 
The Longhorns finished the 2021 season with a 50–17 record and a 17–7 record in conference play where they were crowned Big 12 Regular season co-champions for the 9th time alongside TCU. This was the 24th time the Longhorns have won 50 plus games in a season and the first 50 win season for Texas since 2010.

Postseason 
After the regular season, the Longhorns went 2–2 in the Big 12 Conference tournament. However, the Longhorns went on to win the Austin Regional by defeating Fairfield, and the Austin Super Regional defeating South Florida, sending them to College World Series. The Longhorns went on to go 3–2 in the College World Series and making the final four. After a first round loss to Mississippi State, Texas won three straight games against Tennessee, Virginia, and Mississippi State, and then was defeated by Mississippi State in the second game of the Semifinals.

Personnel

Roster 

Sources:

Starters

Coaches

Support staff

Offseason

Transfers

Recruits
Over the off-season, Texas signed 8 players to its 2021 signing class. Texas signed 5 pitchers, 1 first baseman, and 2 outfielders.

2021 MLB Draft 

At the conclusion of the 2021 season, Texas lost 6 players to the 2021 MLB Draft. Texas ace Ty Madden was the 32nd pick in the first round. Other picks included outfielder Mike Antico picked in the 8th round, relief pitcher Cole Quintanilla picked in the 9th round, starting pitcher Kolby Kubichek picked in the 18th round, starting 3rd baseman Cam Williams picked in the 19th round, and starting 1st baseman Zach Zubia picked in the 20th round. At the end of the draft, Zach Zubia was the 307th player drafted in the history of the University of Texas.

Source:

Preseason

Award watch lists
Listed in the order that they were released

Big 12 media poll
Texas was ranked the #1 team in the Big 12 by members of conference media. The second ranked team, Oklahoma State, had 12 less votes than the Longhorns.

Preseason Big 12 awards and honors

^Ivan Melendez and Tristan Stevens were unanimous selections.

Preseason All-Americans

Sources:

Schedule and results 
{| class="toccolours" width=100% style="margin:1.5em auto; text-align:center;"
|-style=""
! colspan=2|2022 Texas Longhorns Baseball Game Log (47–22)
|-
! colspan=2 | Legend:       = Win       = Loss       = Canceled      Bold = Texas team member
|-style=""
! colspan=2 |Regular Season (39–17)
|- valign="top"
|

|-style=""
! colspan=2 |Postseason (8–5)
|- valign="top" 
|

|-
|
|- 
| * indicates a non-conference game. All rankings from D1Baseball on the date of the contest. Source:
|}

Schedule Notes

Postseason

Big 12 tournament

NCAA tournament

College World Series

Statistics

Team batting

Team pitching

Individual batting 
Note: leaders must meet the minimum requirement of 2 PA/G and 75% of games played

Individual pitching
Note: leaders must meet the minimum requirement of 1 IP/G

Source:

Awards and honors

Rankings

References

Texas
Texas Longhorns baseball seasons
Texas Longhorns baseball
Texas
College World Series seasons